Lanacerta is a genus of moths belonging to the family Tortricidae.

Species
Lanacerta lacertana (Zeller, 1866)

See also
List of Tortricidae genera

References

 , 2002: Black and white forewing pattern in Tortricidae (Lepidoptera), with descriptions of new taxa of Neotropical Euliini. Acta zoologica cracoviensia 45 (3): 245-257. Full article: 
 , 2005, World Catalogue of Insects 5

External links
tortricidae.com

Euliini
Tortricidae genera